Ben Carter may refer to:
 Benjamin F. Carter (1824–1916), Wisconsin politician
 Ben Carter (actor) (1907/10–1946), American actor and casting agent
 Ben Ammi Ben-Israel (1939–2014),  or Ben Carter, American founder and spiritual leader of the African Hebrew Israelites of Jerusalem
 Ben Carter (born 1981), English drummer for metal band Evile
 Ben Carter (Arkansas judge) (c. 1895–1943), associate justice of the Arkansas Supreme Court
 Ben Carter (basketball) (born 1994), American-Israeli basketball player
 Ben Carter (rugby union) (born 2001), Welsh rugby union player